Maria (Greek: Μαρία; died 751) was the second empress consort of Constantine V of the Byzantine Empire.

Empress
Constantine was Emperor since 741 and his first wife, Tzitzak, bore him a son, Leo IV the Khazar, on 25 January 750. There is no further mention of her and, by the following year, Constantine was already married to Maria. Lynda Garland has suggested Tzitzak died in childbirth.

Maria married Constantine between 750 and 751 and, according to the Chronographikon syntomon of Ecumenical Patriarch Nikephoros I of Constantinople, her untimely death occurred at about the same time her stepson Leo IV the Khazar was crowned co-emperor (6 June 751) and her husband recovered Melitene. The reasons are unknown.

Maria died childless and Constantine would proceed to marry Eudokia, who gave him six more children.

References

External links
A short article on her by Lynda Garland

8th-century births
751 deaths
Isaurian dynasty
8th-century Byzantine empresses